Nitin Chandra Ganatra  (born 30 June 1967) is a Kenyan-born British actor. He is known for portraying Masood Ahmed in the BBC soap opera, EastEnders.

Early and personal life
Ganatra was born on 30 June 1967 in Kenya. Both sides of Ganatra's family have origins in Gujarat, India which were explored on-screen in the 2013 series of Who Do You Think You Are? His great-grandfather arrived in Kenya in the late 1890s, as one of 32,000 contracted labourers to build the Uganda Railway. One of under 10,000 to stay in the country after the railway's completion, his grandfather and his father later joined the family's general trading business.

After Kenya gained independence from the United Kingdom and forced the native Indian population to choose between Kenya and their British passports in 1971, Ganatra, aged 3, moved with his family to Coventry, where the family still own a corner shop.

Ganatra was educated at Coundon Court School and Community College on Northbrook Road and then studied Drama, Film and Television at the University of Bristol. He went on to train under the tutelage of the late Master theatre practitioner Jerzy Grotowski.

On 17 July 2004, Ganatra and Meera Thakrar were married. They have two children and live in North London.

In April 2019, he was honoured with the Outstanding Achievement in Television award at The Asian Awards.

Ganatra was appointed Officer of the Order of the British Empire (OBE) in the 2022 New Year Honours for services to drama.

Career
Ganatra is known internationally as Prince Pondicherry in the Tim Burton film Charlie and the Chocolate Factory. He also appears in the Gurinder Chada film Bride and Prejudice as Kholi Saab and The Mistress of Spices as Haroun, and Dev Raja in Mumbai Calling. He also appeared in the first ever iPod commercial. Ganatra also appeared in an episode of The Catherine Tate Show, as Joanie Taylor's daughter's partner.

Other appearances include the television show Jane Hall, the Patents Clerk in Philip Pullman's The Shadow in the North, the CBBC television show Gina's Laughing Gear, a character in Meet the Magoons portraying himself, a semi lead role as Rez, brother of main character Shifty, in the 2008 British cult film Shifty about a Muslim crack-cocaine dealer, and Martin Soper in Twenty Twelve. He also appeared in Being April, portraying the role of Sinil.

On 15 October 2014, Ganatra appeared in an episode of Celebrity Squares. On 25 March 2015, he featured in a comedy interview alongside comedian Paul Chowdhry in which he pretended to lose his temper and "attacked" Chowdhry. His appearance on Pointless Celebrities, in which he had to have the rules explained to him by the host, was included in a 2020 special called Pointless: The Good, the Bad and the Bloopers.

It was announced in May 2017 that Ganatra would appear in comedy feature Eaten by Lions, alongside Antonio Aakeel and Jack Carroll. He also appeared in the Channel 4 drama The State, portraying the father of a young British Muslim who went to join ISIS. In 2020, he portrayed spell science teacher Mr. Daisy in the CBBC series The Worst Witch.
Trial and Retribution as lawyer. Episode, "The Box" part 2.

In 2022, Ganatra also appeared in Episode 4 of the Netflix series Wednesday, directed by Tim Burton, as Dr. Anwar. Then in February 2023, he portrayed Kamil Razaq in an episode of the BBC soap opera Doctors.

EastEnders
Since 16 October 2007, Ganatra has played regular character Masood Ahmed in the BBC One soap opera, EastEnders. He also appeared in the 2010 spin-off series EastEnders: E20. Ganatra left EastEnders in 2016. He made a one-off appearance on 28 November 2017, and returned permanently on 1 January 2018. On 26 January 2019, it was announced Ganatra had decided to leave his role as Masood, and would leave the show later in 2019.

Ganatra won 'Best Onscreen Partnership' with Nina Wadia at The British Soap Awards in 2009, and was later nominated for 'Best Actor' at the British Soap Awards in 2010.

References

External links

1967 births
Living people
20th-century English male actors
21st-century English male actors
Actors from Coventry
Alumni of the University of Bristol
English male film actors
English male television actors
English people of Indian descent
Gujarati people
Kenyan emigrants to the United Kingdom
Kenyan people of Indian descent
Officers of the Order of the British Empire